Telipna sulpitia is a butterfly in the family Lycaenidae. It is found in the north-eastern part of the Democratic Republic of the Congo, southern Sudan and north-western Uganda.

References

Butterflies described in 1924
Poritiinae